Ridin' the Trail is a 1940 American Western film directed by Raymond K. Johnson and written by Phil Dunham. The film stars Fred Scott, Harry Harvey Sr., John Ward, Jack Ingram, Iris Lancaster and Bud Osborne. The film was released on July 27, 1940, by Arthur Ziehm.

This the last of Fred Scott's thirteen singing cowboy movies. After this, Scott had supporting roles in several films, including 1942's Thundering Hoofs, and then he left the film industry to pursue a career in real estate.

Plot

Cast          
Fred Scott as Fred Martin
Harry Harvey Sr. as Fuzzy Jones
John Ward as Pa Bailey
Jack Ingram as Tex Walters
Iris Lancaster as Carmencita Sanchez
Bud Osborne as Sheriff Bradford
Carl Mathews as Blackie
Gene Howard as Joe Simmons
Billy Lenhart as Butch 
James 'Buddy' Kelly as Buddy

References

External links
 

1940 films
American Western (genre) films
1940 Western (genre) films
Films directed by Raymond K. Johnson
American black-and-white films
1940s English-language films
1940s American films